Serpents Unleashed is the fifth studio album by American extreme metal band Skeletonwitch. The album was released on October 29, 2013. This album was the last album released with original vocalist Chance Garnette, before he was fired from the band in early 2015 due to his problems with alcohol.

Track listing

Charts

Personnel
Skeletonwitch
Chance Garnette - vocals
Scott "Scunty D." Hendrick - guitar
Nate "N8 Feet Under" Garnette - guitar
Dustin Boltjes - drums
Evan "Loosh" Linger - bass
Kurt Ballou - production, mixing, engineering

References

2013 albums
Skeletonwitch albums
Albums with cover art by John Dyer Baizley